The National Changhua Senior High School (CHSH) is a Taiwanese high school for boys, located in Changhua City, Changhua County, Taiwan. CHSH was established in 1942 during World War II and the late years of Japanese rule.

The school is accessible south east from Changhua Station of Taiwan Railways Administration.

Notable alumni 
 Stan Shih, the founder, president, and chairman of Acer Inc.
 Henry Lee (forensic scientist), Taiwanese-American forensic scientist
 Richie Jen, singer, actor 
 Tsai Chih Chung, cartoonist
 Yan Hong-sen, academic, politician; former curator of National Science and Technology Museum and former vice president of National Cheng Kung University
 Louis Lee, physicist; former director of the National Applied Research Laboratories and the National Space Organization　
 Wang Sheng-hong, writer 
 Chiu Chuang-chin, politician 
 Chang Juu-en, engineer and former minister of the Environmental Protection Administration
 Kuo Lin-yung, politician; former Vice-Minister of Justice
 Delon Wu, doctor, medical expert; associate professor of University of Illinois at Chicago, professor of Keck School of Medicine of USC, co-founder of Linkou Chang Gung Memorial Hospital, the first chancellor of Chang Gung University College of Medicine

See also
 Education in Taiwan

References

1942 establishments in Taiwan
Buildings and structures in Changhua County
Changhua City
Education in Changhua County
Educational institutions established in 1942
High schools in Taiwan